Miroshnichenko or Miroshnychenko is a surname of Ukrainian origin. It is a patronymic surname literally meaning "son of miller (miroshnik)"

Eugene Miroshnichenko Russian/Ukrainian literature critic, historian, and journalist
 Roman Miroshnichenko  Russian virtuoso guitarist, composer, and band leader
 Sergei Miroshnichenko (disambiguation), several people
 Aleksandr Miroshnichenko Kazakhstani boxer
 Andrei Miroshnichenko  Kazakhstani professional football coach
 Viktor Miroshnichenko Ukrainian boxer
 Evgeniya Miroshnichenko Ukrainian opera and chamber singer
 Evgenij Miroshnichenko Ukrainian chess Grandmaster
 Denys Miroshnichenko Ukrainian football midfielder
 Irina Miroshnichenko Russian actress
 Ihor Miroshnychenko Ukrainian politician
 Ivan Miroshnichenko (born 2004), Russian ice hockey player

See also
 
 

Ukrainian-language surnames
Patronymic surnames